In Mourning may refer to:

 In Mourning (band), a Swedish band
 In Mourning, a 1996 album by Brutality

See also
 Mourning, grief over someone's death
 "In the Mourning", a 2011 song by Paramore